Jack Gore (born ) is an American actor known for playing Timmy Cleary in the ABC series The Kids Are Alright.

Life and career
Gore is from Inwood, Manhattan. He made his film debut in We Are What We Are, in 2013. He also starred in The Michael J. Fox Show (2013) as Mike's and Annie's younger son.

In 2016, Gore, along with his sibling, Mars, launched a detective agency called Gore & Gore Detective Agency. Later, he appeared in Wonder Wheel, where he played Richie.

Gore also starred in several TV series such as Billions (2016) and The Kids Are Alright (2018), where he plays Timmy Cleary, the protagonist of the show, based on showrunner and creator Tim Doyle's own upbringing in a traditional Irish-Catholic family in the 1970s.

Filmography

Film

Television

References

External links
 

American male film actors
American male child actors
American male television actors
21st-century American male actors
Actors from New York (state)
Living people

2000s births

Year of birth uncertain
Place of birth missing (living people)

People from Inwood, Manhattan